Cathy Lee Irwin (born September 4, 1952 in Vancouver, British Columbia) is a Canadian former figure skater who competed in ladies' singles. She is the 1970 Grand Prix International St. Gervais champion, the 1971 Richmond Trophy silver medalist, the 1972 Prize of Moscow News champion, and a two-time Canadian national silver medalist. She competed at the 1972 Winter Olympics in Sapporo, Japan.

Results

References

1952 births
Canadian female single skaters
Figure skaters at the 1972 Winter Olympics
Living people
Olympic figure skaters of Canada
Figure skaters from Vancouver
20th-century Canadian women